Ivydale, West Virginia may refer to:
Ivydale, Clay County, West Virginia, an unincorporated community in Clay County
Ivydale, Kanawha County, West Virginia, an unincorporated community in Kanawha County